Kurtinig an der Weinstraße, often abbreviated to Kurtinig or Cortina, is a comune (municipality) in South Tyrol in northern Italy, located about  southwest of the city of Bolzano.

Kurtinig borders the following municipalities: Margreid, Neumarkt, and Salorno.

History

Coat-of-arms
The emblem is an argent embattled wall, with a portal, above an azure band in the lower half; an eight-pointed star on the left side and the crescent moon on the right, both of argent on a gules background, in the upper half. The embattled wall was built to protect the village from the flooding of the river Etsch; the star and the moon are a recall to the arms of the Lords of Appian which the village belonged.

Society

Linguistic distribution
According to the 2011 census, 68.67% of the population speak German, 31.15% Italian and 0.17% Ladin as first language.

Demographic evolution

References

External links
 Homepage of the municipality

Municipalities of South Tyrol